Oplonia is a genus of plants in the family Acanthaceae.

Synonyms 
 Anthacanthus Nees
 Forsythiopsis Baker

Species 
 Oplonia acicularis
 Oplonia acuminata
 Oplonia acunae
 Oplonia armata
 Oplonia cubensis
 Oplonia grandiflora
 Oplonia hutchisonii
 Oplonia jamaicensis
 Oplonia jujuyensis
 Oplonia linifolia
 Oplonia microphylla
 Oplonia minor
 Oplonia moana
 Oplonia multigemma
 Oplonia nannophylla
 Oplonia polyece
 Oplonia puberula
 Oplonia purpurascens
 Oplonia spinosa
 Oplonia tetrasticha
 Oplonia vincoides

References 
 GBIF entry
 ITIS entry
 JSTOR Plant Science entries
 USDA Germplasm Resources Information Network (GRIN) entry
 USDA PLANTS entry
 Stearn, W. T. 1971. A survey of the tropical genera Oplonia and Psilanthele (Acanthaceae). Bull. Br. Mus. (Nat. Hist.), Bot. 4:259–323.

Acanthaceae
Acanthaceae genera